Navia Club de Fútbol is a Spanish football team based in Navia, in the autonomous community of Asturias. Founded in 1960, it plays in 3ª – Group 2, holding home games at Estadio El Pardo, which has a capacity of 500 spectators.

Season to season

17 seasons in Tercera División

Women's team
Navia created a women's football team in 2017. It started competing in the Regional league.

Season by season

External links
Official website 
Futbolme team profile 

Football clubs in Asturias
Association football clubs established in 1960
1960 establishments in Spain